The Democratic Congress is a political party in Lesotho that split from the Lesotho Congress for Democracy. It is led by Mathibeli Mokhothu.

History 
Before the 2012 election, the ruling Lesotho Congress for Democracy split, with Prime Minister Pakalitha Mosisili leaving the party. He then founded the Democratic Congress, initially incorporating the name of LCD founder Ntsu Mokhehle in the name of the party. The LCD Secretary-General Mothetjoa Metsing then moved to lead the LCD.

Electoral performance 
In its first election the party won a plurality of seats, but failed to get a majority after the allotment of proportional seats. They attempted to form a coalition government but failed.

Election Results

Splits 
In December 2016, Monyane Moleleki, then deputy leader of the Democratic Congress, unveiled a new political party he had formed following his and some members of DC's national executive committee's attempts at ousting Mosisili from the DC.

References

External links

2011 establishments in Lesotho
Pan-Africanism in Lesotho
Pan-Africanist political parties in Africa
Political parties established in 2011
Political parties in Lesotho
Social democratic parties in Africa
Socialism in Lesotho